Jazzpunk is an adventure video game developed by Necrophone Games and published by Adult Swim Games. The game was released for Microsoft Windows, OS X and Linux in February 2014. A director's cut of the game, self-published by Necrophone Games, was released for the PlayStation 4 in September 2016, and for personal computer platforms in June 2017.

Gameplay 
Jazzpunk is a single-player, first-person adventure game, focusing on exploration and comedy over puzzle-solving. Each mission has one central objective, but the player is free to explore the game world at their own pace, which is populated with a large number of interactive NPCs, each with their own action or gag. Mini-games, including mini-golf, a Frogger clone, and a version of Duck Hunt in which the player pelts cardboard ducks with slices of bread from a toaster, also feature prominently in the game's storyline.

The game also features a minigame, titled "Wedding Qake" (later changed to "Wedding Cake"), in which players try to shoot AI-controlled enemies with wedding-themed weaponry, including wedding cake, roses, and champagne corks, in a Quake deathmatch-style contest.

Plot 
The game is centered on a top-secret espionage agency operating out of an abandoned subway station in a fictional place called Japanada in the late 1950s in a surreal retro-futuristic, alternate reality where the Empire of Japan conquered most of North America. The player takes the role of Polyblank, a silent protagonist. The game begins when Polyblank is mailed to the espionage agency in a human-shaped suitcase. He is then given several missions by the head of the organization, all of which begin by ingesting a dose of prescription medicine.  The missions assigned to Polyblank are almost always bizarre and nonsensical, relying heavily on free association and references to older movies and video games. Tasks include degaussing and smuggling pigeons, assassinating cowboys, cross-dressing, killing a pig with a guitar, and photocopying Polyblank's buttocks to fool a security scanner (this also can be done by taking a photo off of the wall).

The first mission begins with Polyblank having to infiltrate a Soviet consulate to recover a data cartridge, the second to go to a sushi restaurant to steal a cowboy's artificial kidney. On the way back from the sushi restaurant, Polyblank is intercepted by agents telling him to 'hand over the wetware', but he escapes. The Director then states that Polyblank should take a holiday while they wait for things to die down. When Polyblank gets to Kai Tak Resort for his holiday, he receives a phone call telling him he has to find the syndicate man (The Editor) on site and switch briefcases with him. Polyblank succeeds, but then passes out after drinking a cocktail. Polyblank wakes up in a hotel room at night with a message telling him to come to the rear pool. In the empty rear pool, Polyblank talks to a man who tells him the resort is a simulation, and to get out he must find, kill and cook the mechanical pig. After doing this, and navigating an electric maze, Polyblank finds himself back in the subway station, only to find the Director and his secretary are cardboard cutouts. He then finds an audio message from the Editor telling him if he wants to see them again he should come to his house. Polyblank goes there, and he is told he must beat the Editor in a game of sport for the Director to be freed. Polyblank loses, and so must find prizes for the Editor. Polyblank does this, inflating the Editor's ego (which inflates the Editor physically), then he pops the Editor with a needle. Polyblank then finds the Director, where to free him he must either press one of two buttons. No matter which Polyblank presses, the Director turns into a crocodile and eats Polyblank. The credits take place in the Director's intestines, and then Polyblank is given special tablets to help him get out. The game ends after Polyblank takes the pills.

Development 
In an interview with Kotaku, developers Luis Hernandez and Jess Brouse stated that the game was originally intended to be a serious game with moments of comic relief thrown in, but that the team liked the comic aspects so much that they changed the entire game into a comedy. The game was originally created as a prototype in 2007, running on a standalone engine. The project was then transferred to Torque3D before being transferred to the Unity game engine, on which the final build was created. Most voices are performed by Hernandez; additional voice acting is provided by Zoë Quinn, Olivia Catroppa, Jim Sterling and Chris Huth.

Alongside the Director's Cut on PC in 2017, a DLC was also released, titled Flavour Nexus, which includes a "lost chapter".

Influences 
According to interviews with staff at Necrophone Games, Jazzpunk is a combination of the creators' favourite literature, movies, and music from the spy, cyberpunk, and film noir genres. The game makes many references to older movies, including Blade Runner, Alien, and Evil Dead II. In early 2014, the authors appeared in an interview conducted by Rock, Paper, Shotgun in which they stated that their idea for a short-form comedy game was partially influenced by the success of the original Portal. During this interview, the staff also mentioned that much of the game's writing was influenced by 1980's cyberpunk literature. The game's unique, cartoony art style was influenced by the work of Saul Bass, Josef Albers, and Gerd Arntz, while the music was composed using audio production methods common in the 1950s and 1960s.  The game's visual elements are also quite similar to Thirty Flights of Loving, whose developer Brendon Chung is thanked in the end credits.

Reception 

Jazzpunk received favourable reviews from critics on launch, earning a 9/10 from Eurogamer, a 7/10 from Destructoid, and a Metacritic score of 75/100.

References

External links
 

2014 video games
Adventure games
Alternate history video games
Art games
Exploration video games
Indie video games
Linux games
MacOS games
Parody video games
PlayStation 4 games
Spy video games
Video games developed in Canada
Windows games
Adult Swim games
Video games set in the 1950s
Surreal comedy
Parodies of video games